Julie Hemsley is a former England women's international footballer who played for Brighton & Hove Albion. Hemsley become the first female to be a member of the FA Council.

References

Year of birth missing (living people)
People from Brighton and Hove
Living people
Place of birth missing (living people)
Damallsvenskan players
Expatriate women's footballers in Sweden
English women's footballers
English expatriate sportspeople in Sweden
England women's international footballers
Brighton & Hove Albion W.F.C. players
The Football Association
English football managers
Female association football managers
Women's association footballers not categorized by position